Tamara Taylor may refer to:

 Tamara Taylor (born 1970), Canadian actress
 Tamara Taylor (rugby union) (born 1981), English rugby player